The Central Unitaria de Trabajadores (CUT) is a national trade union center in Paraguay. It was founded in 1989 and is affiliated with the International Trade Union Confederation.

References

External links
 CUT official site.

Trade unions in Paraguay
International Trade Union Confederation
Trade unions established in 1989